"Kinda Love" is the first single from Scottish singer Darius's second album, Live Twice (2004). Released on 18 October 2004, the song peaked at number eight on the UK Singles Chart and number two on the Scottish Singles Chart.

Content
Darius has said that "Kinda Love" is about the insecurity you feel when you are in love with someone, and how just a little moment with them makes your day.

Music video
The video for "Kinda Love" was shot in southern Spain near Costa de la Luz. It features Darius and his real-life girlfriend, actress Natasha Henstridge. It is based on a scene from the Jim Carrey and Kate Winslet film, Eternal Sunshine of the Spotless Mind, with a bed featuring in forest and beach scenes. Darius and Henstridge are searching for each other and are shown together in the same scenes but cannot see each other.

Track listings
 UK CD1
 "Kinda Love"
 "Butterfly Spirit"
 "Faith in Me"

 UK CD2
 "Kinda Love"
 "Sexy Individual" (songwriting demo)

 UK DVD single
 "Kinda Love" (video)
 "Kinda Love" (behind the scenes footage)
 "She's Coming Home" (audio)

Chart

References

2004 singles
2004 songs
Darius Campbell songs
Mercury Records singles
Song recordings produced by Stephen Lipson
Songs written by Darius Campbell
Songs written by Greg Wells
Songs written by Kara DioGuardi